Norwich City Under-23s and Academy is the youth organisation run by Norwich City F.C. The team is made up of under-23 and academy players and is effectively Norwich City's second-string side, but is limited to three outfield players and one goalkeeper over the age of 23 per game following the introduction of new regulations from the 2012–13 season. The under-18 players among other younger age groups make up the academy team. In March 2018, Norwich City F.C. announced a public mini-bond investment scheme, through sports investment platform Tifosy, with the aim of raising £3,500,000 towards developing new academy facilities. Funds from more than 700 fans and investors exceeded the £3,500,000 target and reached the £5,000,000 limit through a five-year bond scheme, called the Canaries bond, and sold out before it could be made publicly available. With the money, the club has already installed new pitches at its Category 1 Academy, as well as a new irrigation system, cameras for analysis and floodlights. The club has already started work on a new main building, which will house a new gym, classrooms, physios room, changing rooms and offices, and is due to be completed this summer and has just had a roof put on. A stand will also be installed next to the main Academy pitch.

Under-23 squad

Players listed in the U23 squad on Norwich City's official website.

Out on loan

Under-18 squad

Players listed in the U18 squad on Norwich City's official website.

Out on loan

Honours
FA Youth Cup
Winners (2): 1982-83, 2012-13

Academy graduates
Notable players who have progressed through the Norwich City academy.

Todd Cantwell
Max Aarons
Jamal Lewis 
Ben Godfrey
Adam Idah
Josh Murphy
Jacob Murphy
Jordan Thomas
Josh Martin
Korey Smith
Daniel Barden
Tom Adeyemi
Jed Steer
Angus Gunn
Harry Toffolo
Cameron McGeehan
Remi Matthews
Carlton Morris

See also
2016–17 Premier League International Cup 
2016–17 EFL Trophy 
2016–17 Premier League Cup

References

External links
 Norwich City Under-23s at canaries.co.uk
 Norwich City Under-18s at canaries.co.uk

Professional Development League
Football academies in England
Under-23s and Academy
Premier League International Cup